Redheart or Red Heart may refer to:

Plants
Redheart is a common name for several plants and may refer to:

Ceanothus spinosus, a shrub native to southern California and northern Baja California
Erythroxylon mexicanum, a tree native to Mexico
 Dysoxylum rufum, a rainforest tree in the Mahogany family
 Eucalyptus decipiens, a malle tree native to Western Australia

Other
 red hearts, a playing card suit, see Playing card
 Red Heart (1999-2001), a joint venture between the Seven Network and Granada PLC
 Nurse Redheart, a My Little Pony character
 The Red Hearts (U.S. band), a punk band

See also
 Big Red Heart (2010 song), Tracy Bonham song
 Kenshokai RedHearts, women's volleyball team
 Red (disambiguation)
 Heart (disambiguation)